The 1982 Garuda Fokker F28 crash occurred on March 20, 1982, when a Fokker F28, operated by Garuda Indonesian Airways, overran the runway at Tanjung Karang-Branti Airport (Lampung) in the province of Lampung, Indonesia, during very heavy rain. The aircraft had completed a  scheduled flight from Jakarta to Lampung. The aircraft came to rest  from the runway in a field, with the aircraft catching fire. All onboard died.

See also
 1979 Garuda Fokker F28 crash, involving the same type of plane and airline
 Air France Flight 358
 Saudia Flight 163

References

External links
 

Accidents and incidents involving the Fokker F28
Airliner accidents and incidents caused by weather
Aviation accidents and incidents in 1982
Aviation accidents and incidents in Indonesia
Airliner accidents and incidents involving runway overruns
Garuda Indonesia accidents and incidents
1982 in Indonesia
March 1982 events in Asia
1982 disasters in Indonesia